Aftissat is a fishing village in the Western Sahara. It is the location of a large onshore wind farm.

Location

Aftissat is on the Atlantic coast in Boujdour Province of the Western Sahara.
The village is on National Road No. 1, in the section that links the cities of Boujdour and Dakhla, 63 km southwest of Boujdour and 286 km northeast of Dakhla.
It belongs to the Jraifia commune in the Boujdour province of the Laayoune-Sakia El Hamra region.

Origins

The village of Aftissat was established in 2005 as part of a development program of the Ministry of Agriculture and Fisheries, aimed at establishing fishermen's villages and equipped ports along the Moroccan coast, in order to strengthen the marine fishing sector and revive traditional fishing.
It is one of four fishing villages in the Boujdour province, the others being Lacraa, Agti el Ghazi (اكطً الغازي) and Port Boujdour (مٌناء بوجدور).

Facilities and infrastructure

Avtisat has one fish market, 30 stores for fish trading and 204 stores for sailors, as well as a box store and an engine repair workshop.
The village has 635 boats for traditional fishing.

Wind farm

The Astissat wind farm was built by Energie Eolienne du Maroc (EEM), a wholly-owned subsidiary of Nareva.
It has 56 Siemens wind turbines with nominal power of 3.6MW, and delivers 201.6MW, or 1,000GWh per year.
Windhoist was responsible for erecting the turbines.
The project cost was estimated as $391 million.
The project included construction of the  400kV power line from Laayoune to Aftissat.
This is a stage in connecting Dakhla, which is further south, to the Moroccan grid.

Commercial operations began in October 2018.
The wind farm delivers energy over the national VHV/HV network to large industrial consumers.
Customers mentioned in a December 2016 statement by Nareva included LafargeHolcim Maroc, OCP, Ciments du Maroc, Sonasid, Managem, la Snep and Air Liquide Maroc.
Both the EU Court of Justice and the UN Human Rights Council have said that the consent of representatives of the people of Western Sahara is required for a project like this.
This requirement does not seem to have been met.
The issue was raised in a question to the EU parliament. 
The response was that the EU would respond to questions about exploitation of natural resources by pointing out the unresolved legal status of Western Sahara.

In September 2021 GE Renewable Energy announced that EEM had selected it to supply 40 onshore wind turbines to power a 200MW extension to the Aftissat onshore wind farm.
The Cypress turbines will be moderated at 5.0MW, and will have rotors with a  diameter.
The project was expected to come into operation in 2023.
Following the expansion the Aftissat wind farm would be the largest in Morocco.

Notes

Citations

Sources

Populated places in Western Sahara
Wind farms in Morocco